In the field of dialectology, a diasystem or polylectal grammar is a linguistic analysis set up to encode or represent a range of related varieties in a way that displays their structural differences.

The term diasystem was coined by linguist and dialectologist Uriel Weinreich in a 1954 paper as part of an initiative in exploring how to extend advances in structuralist linguistic theory to dialectology to explain linguistic variation across dialects. Weinreich's paper inspired research in the late 1950s to test the proposal. However, the investigations soon showed it to be generally untenable, at least under structuralist theory. With the advent of generative theory in the 1960s, researchers tried applying a generative approach in developing diasystemic explanations; this also fell short.

According to some leading sociolinguists, the diasystem idea for incorporating variation into linguistic theory has been superseded by William Labov's notion of the linguistic variable. As such, the concept has not been part of any substantial linguistic theory and the term has limited currency in linguistics.

Origin of the concept
 first suggested comparing accents by their synchronic states, rather than by comparing their different historical developments. He classified sound differences between dialects into three types:
Phonological: the inventory phonemes and contextual restrictions, which may vary between dialects.
Phonetic: how phonemes are realized phonetically.  For example, most dialects of English have strongly aspirated  in words like park, tool, and cat, but some Northern English accents do not feature such aspiration.
Etymological distribution: the distribution of phonemes among member words in an interdialectal lexical correspondence set.

Despite Trubetzkoy's proposal, linguists continued to consider variation between varieties outside of the scope of inquiry of grammar construction; each variety, in their thinking, should only be studied on its own terms.

Inspired by Trubetzkoy,  proposed a synthesis of linguistic geography and descriptive linguistics by applying the structuralist concept of grammar to the description of regular correspondences between different varieties; a resulting supergrammar, which he called a diasystem, would  be consistent with the individual grammars of all the member dialects. A diasystem is a higher order system and its component units of analysis would accordingly be abstractions of a higher order than the units of analysis of the individual systems. That is, just as the phones present within an individual variety are grouped together into abstract phonemes, the phonemes present within a group of varieties could be grouped together into even more abstract diaphonemes.  Weinreich exemplified the diasystemic approach by a formulaic arrangement of phoneme correspondences in three dialects of Yiddish, focusing on the vowels but arguing that the principle could work for other aspects of language.

Although Weinreich did not elaborate the diasystemic approach, he did consider some theoretical pitfalls to be avoided.

Subsequent investigation
A few linguists took up Weinreich's challenge and quickly found it to be inadequate. Some of the failures had been anticipated by Weinreich himself, as described above.

 found an extreme example of divergent incidence in a study of two dialects of Swiss German, Luzerner and Appenzeller, which evolved independently of each other. Although each dialect had the same set of eleven short vowel phonemes, only one pair ( ~ ) was shown to have a common parent vowel in earlier stages of German. The remaining phonetic similarities between the Luzerner and Appenzeller phoneme sets were fortuitous results of multiple mergers and splits that each dialect underwent separately.

The research and debate concluded that multiple dialects could not be described by a common grammar, at least not under structuralist theory. That is, it would be unfeasible to construct a single grammar for multiple dialects unless their differences were very minor or if it incorporated only a small number of dialects.

Related to Weinreich's proposal were efforts in both American dialectology and generative phonology to construct an "overall system" that represented the underlying representation for all dialects of English.

The other three are found in specific dialects or dialect groups:  represents the vowel of road in New England varieties;  represents a vowel that often appears in stressed syllables in words like just (when it means 'only'); and  represents the vowel of pot in Southern British and New England dialects.

These nine simple vowels can then be combined with any of three offglides to make 36 possible complex nuclei. This system was popular amongst American linguists (despite criticism, particularly from Hans Kurath) until  demonstrated its inadequacy.

The most salient criticism of these broad diasystems was the issue of how cognitively real they are.  That is, whether speakers actually have competence in using or understanding the grammatical nuances of multiple varieties.  In certain sociolinguistic circumstances, speakers' linguistic repertoire contains multiple varieties. For example,  argues that Modern Literary Arabic is a diasystem of various interference phenomena occurring when speakers of different Arabic varieties attempt to speak or read Literary Arabic.

As a critic of Weinreich's original proposal, he approached the concept as a generativist, putting forth a series of rules that could generate any possible output reflected in the diversity and variability of sociologically conditioned linguistic variables. Because most speakers of Norwich could vary their pronunciation of each variable depending on the circumstances in which they are speaking, the diasystem's rules reflected speakers' actual linguistic abilities.

Cognitively real diasystems are not limited to humans.  For example, crows are able to distinguish between different calls that prompt others to disperse, assemble, or rescue; these calls show regional variation so that French crows do not understand recorded American calls. Although captive birds show difficulty understanding the calls of birds from nearby regions, those allowed to migrate are able to understand calls from both, suggesting that they have mentally constructed a diasystem that enables them to understand both call systems.

Still, these sorts of "idiosyncratic" grammars differ in degree from broader diasystems, which are much less likely to be part of speakers' linguistic competence. Even Trudgill has argued against their cognitive reality, deeming the concept of a broad diasystem to be a "theoretical dead-end." Although the concept did not withstand scrutiny by research linguists, it nevertheless triggered a surge of academic work that used it in applied linguistics (e.g. for ESL education materials, composition texts for native speakers, basic linguistics texts, and in the application of linguistics to literary criticism). Diasystemic representations are also possible in dictionaries. For example, the Macquarie Dictionary reflects the pronunciation of four phonetically distinct sociolects of Australian English. Because these sociolects are the same phonemically, readers (at least, those from Australia) can interpret the system as representing their own accent.

See also
Creole continuum
Dialect continuum

Notes

Citations

Works cited

.

Further reading

Language varieties and styles